Triplophysa minuta is a species of ray-finned fish in the genus Triplophysa.

References
 

minuta
Fish described in 1966
Taxa named by Li Sizhong (ichthyologist)